Wanzhou District is a district in Chongqing, China and the site of a former prefecture. 

Wanzhou or Wan Prefecture (萬州) may also refer to:

Wanzhou, a former prefecture in roughly modern Bazhong, Sichuan, China
Wanzhou, a former prefecture in roughly modern Wanning, Hainan, China